Live at the BBC  is a double compact disc compilation album by British blues rock band Fleetwood Mac, recorded at various BBC radio sessions between 1967 and 1971. It contains many tracks by Fleetwood Mac which are otherwise unavailable.

Track listing

Disc one

Disc two

Personnel
Fleetwood Mac
Peter Green – guitar, harmonica, vocals
Jeremy Spencer – guitar, piano, vocals
Danny Kirwan – guitar, vocals
John McVie – bass guitar
Mick Fleetwood – drums, percussion
Christine McVie (née Perfect) – piano, backing vocals ("Preachin'"); as guest: ("Preachin' Blues", "Need Your Love So Bad", "Stop Messing Around")
Guests
Neil Picket – fiddle ("Sandy Mary", "Only You")
Eddie Boyd – piano ("I Can't Hold Out")

Notes
Footnotes

References

BBC Radio recordings
Fleetwood Mac live albums
1995 live albums
1995 compilation albums
Castle Communications live albums